Cuba-Rushford High School is a public high school located in Cuba, Allegany County, New York, United States, and is the only high school operated by the Cuba-Rushford Central School District.

Footnotes

Schools in Allegany County, New York
Public high schools in New York (state)